The Idaho Rodeo Hall of Fame is a rodeo cowboy hall of fame. The hall of fame was established in 2013.

History
The Idaho Rodeo Hall of Fame was established as a 501 (c)(3) non-profit organization on May 6, 2013. Lonnie and Charmy LeaVell are the founders of the organization. The actual charitable nonprofit status was received from the IRS on February 19, 2014. The IRHF hosts a reunion and induction ceremony annually every October.

Organization
The Idaho Hall of Fame preserves and promotes the Western lifestyle and its heritage. The hall exists to dedicate the men and women in rodeo who contribute to ranching and farming through their sport. It also extends its reach to continue these western ways to the youth in the communities to ensure that these traditions continue for many generations. In 2015, the hall was awarded the Historic Preservation Recognition Award by National Society of the Daughters of the American Revolution.

Inductees

Class of 2021
 Jeff Bowden
 Vic Carman
 Kent Cooper*
 Helen Daniel*
 Skip Daniel
 Betty Schnell Freeman
 Scott Kesl
 Dean Harrington
 Ginger Harrington
 Lonnie LeaVell
 John Prater
 Mike Prater
The Roser Family
 (*Jim, Dan, Tim, Jon, Mark)
 Debra Stephens
 Jerry Thompson
 War Bonnet Round UP

Class of 2020
 Arlene Worley
 Caldwell Night Rodeo
 Casey McGehee
 Elaine Vail
 Gayle Gray
 Jeff Crockett
 Jerry Gorrel
 John Schoorl
 Lee Markholt
 Lonnie Hale
 Lyle Buhler
 Patti Kaufman
 Robin "Rob" Juker
 Sandy McCleod
 Snake Eater (Slash T Rodeo)
 Steve Kaufman
 Teri McCleod
 Tim Oyler

Class of 2019
 Jed Baker
 Katie Breckenridge
 Christensen Brothers
 Bobby Christensen
 Linda Christensen Parkhurst
 Sheri Christensen Smets
 Ronnie Koll
 Lewiston Roundup
 Clyde Longfellow
 Edie Longfellow
 Keith Maddox
 Joe Marvel
 Mike Marvel
 Pete Marvel
 Burel Mulkey
 Juanita O'Maley
 Jim Steen
 Rob Struthers
 Jon Taylor
War Paint
Hank Williams
Jackson Sundown

Class of 2018
 Kirk and Stevia Webb
 Robert L. Tyler
 Arthur Louis Tyler
 Judi VanDorn Thacker
 Jonie James Smith
 Everett Prescott
 Ernie Sites
 Jim Fain
 Karen Fain
 Dee Pickett
 Zane Davis
 Shawn Davis
 Cody Bequeath
 Casey Bequeath
 Harry Charters

Class of 2017
 Kay Davis
 Larry Davis
 Lisa Rae Davis
 John Robert Davis
 Harry Hamilton
 Dean Oliver
 Jake Pope
 Katherine Pope
 Bingo
 Sue Ellen Smith
 Larry Smith, ICA Judge
 Gary and Bev Stone
 Johnny Urrutia

Class of 2016
Earl Bascom
 Weldon Bascom
 Deanne Bell
 Edmund E. "Tex" Bouscal
 Earl E. "Tim" Bouscal
 Guy W. Cash Sr.
 LeRoy A. Hess
 L. Wardell Larson
 David R. Stoecklein
 Kelly Wardell
 Val Christensen
 Walter J. Parke

Class of 2015
 Troy Perkins
 Grant Roberts
 Jackie Parke Roeser
 Billy Stephens
 Bob Stephens
 Fred Stephens
 Jake Stephens
 Charley Stovner
 Danna Stovner
 Jim Vickers
 Sandy Vickers
Jan Youren
 Bill Aller

Class of 2014
 Curtis Cutler
 Bill Edmo
 Frank Edmo
 Kesley Edmo
 Lamose Edmo
 Dennis Manning
 Bob Monroe
 Governor Butch Otter
 Marty Bennett

Class of 2013
 Karl Gibson
 Lonnie Hatch
 Albert VanDorn
 Irene Wilson
 Mickey Young
 Zeb Bell

Class of 2012
 Herb Ingersoll
 Lana Parker
 Tim Parker
 Darrel Wesley "Virg" Vail
 Blanch Angell

Class of 2011
 Karl U. (Bud) Bedke
 Howard Belyeu
 George Gentner
 Wendell R. Johnson
 Orla Knight
 Terry Reiter
 Pete Crump

Class of 2010
 Jim Fenstermaker
 Jim Gibbs
 Bob Johnson
 Chuck Palecek
 Jack Schild
 Dee Christensen

Class of 2009
 Tom Eddy
 Benny Freeman
 Bob Gill
 Delbert Jim
 Lonnie Leavell
 Pat O'Maley
 Dick Anderson

Class of 2008
 Neal Arave
 Mike Isley
 Dean Patterson
 Lonnie Wright
 Avon Young

Class of 2008
 Lloyd Brown
 Calvin Gorrell

Class of 2007
 Bill Hurd
 Alan Patterson
 Gene Schiffler
 Jasper Thomason
 Tom Webb
 Adrian Carlson

Class of 2006
 Buddy Hugues
 Allen Hunt
 Bud Jenkins
 Stan Potts
 Jim Siebel
 Jerry Twitchell
 Frank Davis

Class of 2005
 Rusty Houtz
 Bob Juker
 Ted Lisle
 Buddy Peak
 George Richmond
 Bud Roseberry
 Mo Sagers
 Bob Scarbrough
 Jay T. Smith
 Joe Black

Class of 2004
 Deb Copenhaver
 Danny Gorrell
 Kay Hunt
 Bob Schild
 Louie Vaughn
 Curley Angell

Class of 2003
 Bob Craig
 Earl Elsner
 Harvey Helderman
 Larry Robinson
 Coke High (horse)

Class of 2002
 Daryle Hobdey
 Karen James
 George Juker
 Sod Williams
 Dale Brown

Class of 2001
 Bud Godby
 Joe Leguineche
 Bob A. Robinson
 Ernie Stevens

Source:

References

External links 
  Official Website

Cowboy halls of fame
Sports halls of fame
Sports hall of fame inductees
Halls of fame in Idaho
Awards established in 2013
Museums established in 2013
Lists of sports awards